Fan Chiang Tai-chi (born 12 September 1970) is a former Taiwanese politician, now an actor. He was the Deputy Minister of the Research, Development and Evaluation Commission (RDEC) of the Executive Yuan from 18 February 2013 until 21 January 2014. In 2015, he became an actor.

Political career
Prior to taking office as the deputy head of RDEC, Fan was the spokesperson of the ROC Presidential Office.

References

1970 births
Living people
Political office-holders in the Republic of China on Taiwan